Eshkol Regional Council (Mo'atza Ezorit Eshkol) is a regional council in the north-western Negev, in Israel's Southern District. The regional council's territory lies midway between Ashkelon and Beersheba, bounded on the west by the Gaza Strip while the eastern border abuts the territory of the Bnei Shimon Regional Council. Due to its proximity to the Gaza Strip, the region has experienced numerous sporadic waves of violence, primarily as a result of rocket attacks, mortar strikes, and fires caused by incendiary kites and balloons launched from Gaza Strip. These waves of violence often result in widespread damage to farms and structures within the region.

Transport
Eshkol Regional Council is linked to Tel Aviv by bus routes 379 (local) and route 479 (express), to Be'er Sheva by bus route 35, to Ashkelon by bus route 36 and to Jerusalem by bus 495. Inside the regional council's territory there are six bus routes linking the kibbutzim and the moshavim to the regional council offices. All bus routes are operated by Dan BaDarom.

Security

The Eshkol region has been the target of thousands of rocket attacks since 2000. Despite Iron Dome coverage in the region, usage of the system is generally limited to populated areas and allows other rockets to land in open areas. As a result, there has been widespread damage to farms, vehicles and various outlying structures. During the 2014 Israel–Gaza conflict, farmers reported massive damages to their crops due to rockets landing in open fields.

On 26 August 2014 a mortar shell fired from Gaza was reported to have killed one person and seriously wounded two others at the Eshkol Regional Council.

Since 2016, the region has experienced waves of fires caused by incendiary balloons released from Gaza. The fires have caused widespread damage to farms and local infrastructure. More than 100 fires were reported in June 2019 alone, with reported damage to at least 4,500 acres of farmland. This tactic by Hamas and other militant groups in Gaza is considered to be a form of agro-terrorism.

Villages

Kibbutzim

Be'eri
Alumim
Ein HaShlosha
Gvulot
Magen
Nir Oz
Nir Yitzhak
Nirim
Holit
Kerem Shalom
Kissufim
Re'im
Sufa
Tze'elim
Urim

Moshavim

Amioz
Ein HaBesor
Dekel
Mivtahim
Naveh
Ohad
Peri Gan
Sde Nitzan
Sdei Avraham
Talmei Eliyahu
Talmei Yosef
Yated
Yesha
Yevul

Other locations
Avshalom
Tzohar
Shlomit

References

External links
Official website 

 
1951 establishments in Israel
Commemoration of Levi Eshkol
Regional councils in Israel